Margaret Dorothy Shelton (1915–1984) was a Canadian artist who lived nearly all of her life in Alberta. She worked in a number of mediums but is best known for her block printing.

Biography
Margaret Shelton was born August 15, 1915 in Bruce, Alberta. From 1933 to 1934 she attended the Normal School in Calgary eventually earning her teaching certificate and teaching for a brief time. She attended night and summer classes  at the Provincial Institute of Technology and Art (PITA) from 1934 through 1943. In 1938 she earned her MFA from the Banff School of Fine Arts.

Shelton was a member of the Alberta Society of Artists, the Calgary Sketch Club, the Canadian Society of Graphic Art, and the Society of Canadian Painter-Etchers and Engravers. She had major exhibitions at the Burnaby Art Gallery, British Columbia in 1981, and at the Glenbow Museum, Calgary in 1985. 

Shelton died in 1984 in Calgary.

Shelton was included in the 2012 exhibition Alberta Mistresses of the Modern: 1935-1975 at the Art Gallery of Alberta.

Bibliography
Ainslie, Patrici. Margaret Shelton: Block Prints 1936-1984 Glenbow Museum, exhibition catalogue, Calgary, Alberta, 1984 
Cochran, Bente Roed. Printmaking in Alberta, 1945-1985 University of Alberta Press, Edmonton, Alberta, 1989 p159

External links 
images of Margaret Shelton art on The Collectors' Gallery
The Glenbow Museum entry on Margaret Shelton

References 

1915 births
1984 deaths
Artists from Alberta
20th-century Canadian women artists